Mary MacLaren (born Mary Ida MacDonald, also credited Mary McLaren; January 19, 1900 – November 9, 1985) was an American film actress in both the silent and sound eras. She was the younger sister of actresses Miriam and Katherine MacDonald and appeared in more than 170 films between 1916 and 1949.

Early life and stage work
Born in Pittsburgh, Pennsylvania, Mary was the youngest of three daughters of Lillian Edith (née Agnew) and William Albert MacDonald. Her two sisters, Miriam and Katherine MacDonald, also became actors, and another sibling, her brother Edward, died at birth in 1901, 14 months after Mary was born. Federal census records for 1900 document that Mary's father supported his family working as the proprietor of a hotel in Pittsburgh. By 1910, however, her parents had divorced, and Lillian worked as a dressmaker to support her daughters. Before moving with her mother, Miriam, and Katherine to New York City around 1913, Mary obtained her basic education in Greensburgh (now Greensboro), Pennsylvania.

Once situated in New York, all three girls began working either in modeling, performing on stage in minor acting roles, or dancing in revues. Mary began her own stage career in the Winter Garden in New York City with Al Jolson in The Passing Show of 1914 and Dancing Around.

Films

MacLaren's screen career began in 1916 with Shoes. She subsequently performed in productions for the Universal Film Manufacturing Company, including Idle Wives (1916), The Plow Woman (1917), The Model's Confession (1918), The Petal on the Current (1919), The Unpainted Woman (1919), Bonnie Bonnie Lassie (1919), Rouge and Riches (1920), and many others. Among her more notable film roles is her performance as Queen Anne of Austria in the 1921 Douglas Fairbanks production of The Three Musketeers.

In studio directories and trade publications, the 5'3" MacLaren was described as having blue eyes and "masses of blond hair" and being an accomplished swimmer and tennis player. While the height of her screen career was in the silent era, she successfully transitioned into sound productions and continued to perform periodically in films throughout the 1930s and into the early 1940s.

Later years and death
In 1979 in California, the long-retired actress resisted attempts by Los Angeles County officials to declare MacLaren mentally incompetent and to assume control of her finances due to repeated charges  that she was living in her "dilapidated home" with too much clutter and too many pets. She appeared before the Superior Court commissioner who ruled that she was capable of managing her own affairs.

MacLaren, at age 85, died of "respiratory problems" at West Hollywood Hospital in California in November 1985.

Selected filmography

 John Needham's Double (1916)
 Where Are My Children? (1916)
 Shoes (1916) 
 Saving the Family Name (1916)
 The Mysterious Mrs. M (1917)
 Money Madness (1917)
 The Plow Woman (1917)
 The Model's Confession (1918)
 Bread (1918)
 The Vanity Pool (1918)
 The Unpainted Woman (1919)
 The Petal on the Current (1919)
 Bonnie Bonnie Lassie (1919)
 The Pointing Finger (1919)
 Rouge and Riches (1920)
 The Forged Bride (1920)
 The Road to Divorce (1920)
 The Three Musketeers (1921)
 The Wild Goose (1921)
 Across the Continent (1922)
 The Face in the Fog (1922)
 Under the Red Robe (1923)
 On the Banks of the Wabash (1923)
 The Uninvited Guest (1924)
 The Phantom Broadcast (1933)
 Headline Shooter (1933)
 Westward Ho (1935)
 The New Frontier (1935)
 Saddle Aces (1935)
 Chatterbox (1936)
 King of the Pecos (1936)
 What Becomes of the Children? (1936)
Reckless Ranger (1937)
 52nd Street (1937)
A Lawman Is Born (1937)
 Prairie Pioneers (1941)

Notes

References

Further reading

External links

1900 births
1985 deaths
20th-century American actresses
American film actresses
American silent film actresses
Actresses from Pittsburgh
Burials at Forest Lawn Memorial Park (Glendale)